A Preliminary discourse may be prefixed to any publication and may refer to:
Preliminary Discourse to the Encyclopedia of Diderot
Preliminary Discourse to AlKoran